Maingear (stylized as MAINGEAR) is an American privately held computer manufacturer headquartered in Warren, New Jersey. The company builds, designs, and supports custom desktops, gaming computers, customizable laptops, and workstations in the United States.

History
Maingear is a high-performance PC system builder that offers custom desktops, custom-built laptops, workstations, small form factor PCs, and media.

The company was founded in 2002 by Wallace Santos, founder and CEO. He began building high-performance computers with a focus on customer service and luxury quality. In November 2022, professional gamer Shroud announced on Twitter that he would start serving as the co-owner of Maingear.

Craftsmanship
All units are assembled, configured, and tested in the United States. Maingear computers provide custom wiring, water-cooling, custom painting, and more. The components are analyzed by their research and development department to ensure they cooperate efficiently with each other. Companies like Coca-Cola have partnered with Maingear for custom products.

A notable desktop designed by HP and made by Maingear is the "OMEN X". Forbes stated that “HP was wise to select Maingear as their partner in this space because they are one of the few boutique builders that has a solid product and process in place.” Coca-Cola has also partnered with Maingear for a custom showcase gaming PC to highlight Coca-Cola’s E-Sports division.

Partnerships 

In 2016, Razer Inc. collaborated with Maingear to release the R1 Razer Edition.

The company has also partnered with HP Inc. to release a custom-tuned version of their Omen X. This gaming desktop is already offered by HP although Maingear modified the existing design.

The E-Sports betting platform, Unikrn, announced it will be working with Maingear to “change the world of gaming”. In 2018, the two companies announced a UKG CryptoMining PC.

Along with his November 2022 co-ownership announcement, Shroud also announced that he is partnering with Maingear and released his own build, the "MG1: shroud Edition".

References

Companies based in Union County, New Jersey
Computer companies of the United States
Computer companies